Hebbe is a surname. Notable people with the surname include: 

Geoffrey Hebbe (fl.1413-1423), English politician
John Hebbe (fl. 1397), English politician
Signe Hebbe (1837–1925), Swedish singer (soprano), actress, and theatre pedagogue
Wendela Hebbe (1808–1899), Swedish journalist, publicist and author, regarded as the first professional female journalist
Henry Hebbe (1915–1985), Norwegian speed skater

See also
Hebbe Falls, a waterfall in Karnataka, India